Brainiac is a supervillain appearing in American comic books published by DC Comics. The character was created by Otto Binder and Al Plastino and first appeared in Action Comics #242 in July 1958. Brainiac is usually depicted as an extraterrestrial android or cyborg and enemy of Superman and the Justice League. He is known for shrinking and stealing Kandor, the capital city of Superman's home planet Krypton, and is even responsible for Krypton's destruction in some continuities.

The character's name is a portmanteau of the words brain and maniac. In 2009, Brainiac was ranked by IGN’s as 17th Greatest Comic Book Villain of All Time. He has been substantially adapted into various forms of media, having been voiced by Corey Burton in the DC Animated Universe, John Noble in the animated film Superman: Unbound, and Jeffrey Combs in the video game Injustice 2. In live-action television, Brainiac has been portrayed by James Marsters on Smallville and by Blake Ritson on Krypton.

Fictional character biography

Silver Age

The first Brainiac/Kandor comic book story in Action Comics #242 (July 1958) was based on a story arc in the Superman comic strip from April through August 1958. In the comic strip story, Superman's foe was named Romado, who traveled the cosmos with a white alien monkey named Koko, shrinking major cities and keeping them in glass jars. The strip's Kryptonian bottled city was named Dur-El-Va. This cross-continuity conflict was not unprecedented; in 1958 and '59, editor Mort Weisinger used the comic strip to prototype a number of concepts that he planned to introduce in the book, including Bizarro and red Kryptonite.

Brainiac is a bald, green-skinned humanoid who arrives on Earth and shrinks various cities, including Metropolis, storing them in bottles with the intent of using them to restore the then-unnamed planet he ruled. He was originally notable only for having shrunk the bottle city of Kandor with his shrinking ray and for using a force field. In his initial story, he also traveled with a white alien monkey named Koko; the monkey also appears in a 1960 Superman story retelling the story of Kandor's disappearance (Superman #141 (November 1960)). Koko was quickly dropped from Brainiac's stories, but a version of the monkey has made sporadic appearances as the villain's pet in the series Justice and the 2008 storyline "Brainiac" in Action Comics. The villain's descendant Brainiac 5 also had a pet named Koko for several stories in the 1990s.

In subsequent appearances in this early period, Brainiac was used mostly as a plot device rather than as a featured villain of the month. Brainiac's next appearance was mostly behind the scenes, when he tried to kill Lois Lane and Lana Lang, prompting Superman to give Lois and Lana superpowers. But the villain remained unseen except as a plot twist at the end of the story. Brainiac's next appearance was in "Superman's Return to Krypton" in Superman #141 (November 1960), in which the villain stole the bottle city of Kandor, the only city on Krypton that believes Jor-El's warning of doom for the planet, and which had already built a space ark within the city to save the population. Brainiac's next present-day appearance was in Action Comics #275 (April 1961), which showed the villain planning to defeat Superman by exposing him to red-green kryptonite, which he had created, giving Superman a third eye on the back of his head, forcing him to wear various hats to hide it. Superman soon defeated Brainiac and sent him off into the distant past. This was the first in-story appearance of Brainiac's iconic red diode/electrode-like objects atop his head, which had previously appeared on the cover of his first appearance in Action Comics #242 (July 1958), but were not shown in the actual story. In Superboy #106 (July 1963), an infant Superman meets Brainiac, and it is explained that Brainiac looks the same due to his 200-year life span. In Superman #93, Brainiac regenerates himself. It is revealed that he came from a planet called Bryak and, after a voyage in space, he returned to find everybody dead from a plague. He intended to get people from other planets (in shrunken cities to be enlarged with his growth ray) to repopulate Bryak, where he would rule them.

Brainiac's legacy was revealed in Action Comics #276 (May 1961), in a Legion of Super-Heroes back-up story. This story introduced Brainiac 5, who claimed to be Brainiac's 30th-century descendant. Unlike his ancestor, Brainiac 5 used his "twelfth-level intellect" for the forces of good and joined the Legion alongside Supergirl, with whom he fell in love. His home planet was given variously as Bryak, Yod, Yod-Colu, or simply Colu. 20th century Colu is a rim world found on the approach to the Magellanic Clouds.

In Superman #167 (February 1964), it was retconned that Brainiac was a robotic Coluan entity created by the Computer Tyrants of Colu to spy on and invade other worlds. Brainiac's distinctive gridwork of red diodes on his head are explained as "electric terminals of his sensory 'nerves'" necessary for him to function. To explain the 1961 introduction of the villain's living descendant Brainiac 5, the story reveals the Computer Tyrants provided the villain with an assistant, a young Coluan boy named Vril Dox tasked with masquerading as his "son" so others would believe Brainiac to be a trustworthy organic alien scientist with a family rather than a deadly robot. The young boy Vril Dox was designated "Brainiac 2". In the same issue, the letter column contained a "special announcement" explaining that the change in the characterization of Brainiac was "in deference" to the "Brainiac Computer Kit", a toy computer created by Edmund Berkeley (and based on the Geniac) that predated the creation of the comic book character.

In this same story, Luthor discovers the Computer Tyrants could have given their robot villain a twelfth-level intellect but only gave him a tenth-level, the same as them, so he would not dominate them. Luthor frees Brainiac from imprisonment and increases his intellect to a twelfth-level one. He also implants a device to temporarily disable him or destroy him if necessary. The two join forces, but Brainiac later removes the device and blocks out Luthor's memory of his inner workings and the fact that he is a machine. This story becomes the first of many Brainiac/Luthor team-ups. Meanwhile, Vril Dox leads a revolt against the Computer Tyrants, eventually destroying them and freeing Colu. Brainiac sees a monument to this when he returns to Colu later on.

King Kull later enlisted Brainiac and Mister Atom of Earth-S to attack the city of Tomorrow and speed up the rotation enough for the people of Earth to fly into the air. They are defeated by Green Lantern of Earth-Two, Green Lantern of Earth-One, Flash of Earth-Two, Flash of Earth-One, Mercury of Earth-S, and Ibis the Invincible of Earth-S.

30th century (Pre-Crisis)
At some indeterminate point in time, Brainiac fled into the 30th century. Developing the ability to absorb and manipulate massive amounts of stellar energy, he remade himself as "Pulsar Stargrave". He became a powerful enemy of the Legion of Super-Heroes, and once masqueraded as Brainiac 5's biological father. In current continuity, Brainiac's connection to Pulsar Stargrave remains an open question, one even Brainiac 5 has yet to resolve.

Bronze Age

After being revealed to be a robotic being, some Brainiac stories would end with the villain seemingly destroyed, only for him to appear again in a repaired body or having transmitted his consciousness into a new robotic form. Since he was essentially a living computer program that could be housed in different forms if "killed," Brainiac was sometimes referred to on comic book covers as "the villain who won't die!"

In the 1980s, DC Comics attempted to re-define several aspects of Superman's stories to boost sagging sales. In Action Comics #544-546 (June–August 1983), Lex Luthor acquires a renewed sense of purpose and dons a high-tech "warsuit," while Brainiac is reimagined by writer Marv Wolfman and artist Gil Kane and given a new appearance designed by Ed Hannigan. In a previous story, Brainiac had constructed a giant, computer-controlled planet to destroy Superman only to then be defeated by the hero and then trapped in the planet's core. In Wolfman and Kane's story "Rebirth", published in Action Comics #544, Brainiac attempts to free himself by causing the nearby star, Epsilon 4, to go nova and utilize its energy. Instead, his body is converted into energy; his living program, his consciousness, experiences a strange journey before returning to his technology, where a new body is created for him over the next few months. As Brainiac recollects, during his journey he saw a great hand reach out from a void, ensnaring him briefly before releasing him. He also remembers seeing Superman's face at the same time. Reborn in a new body, the villain believes he has seen the Master Programmer, the divine force behind the universe's creation, and that this entity created Superman as an "angel of death" to destroy Brainiac. More determined than ever to kill and study Superman, Brainiac now has a colder, more merciless, and robot-like personality than before (he claims he is without emotions, yet shows signs of hatred and fear in regards to Superman). His new body is overtly robotic with a skull-like face and a reflective, iridescent honeycomb-patterned "braincase." He also creates a starship shaped like his new skull and adorned by metal tendrils, often referred to by fans and comic creators as the "skull ship." The ship acts as an extension of Brainiac himself. Brainiac retains this robotic appearance until after the Crisis on Infinite Earths miniseries ends in 1986, rebooting DC Comics continuity.

This incarnation of Brainiac meets his final end in the "Whatever Happened to the Man of Tomorrow?" storyline that ended the Pre-Crisis Silver/Bronze Age Superman chronology. Lex Luthor finds Brainiac's robotic head unit, with barely any power left. He hopes to team up with the evil living program again, only to become an unwilling host body for Brainiac instead. Fighting Brainiac's control, Luthor begs a superpowered Lana Lang to kill him, who complies by breaking his neck. Luthor dies and Brainiac retains control of the body for a short time until rigor mortis sets in. "Propelled by sheer malice", Brainiac's head unit leaves Luthor's corpse and crawls a few inches before finally running out of power for good.

Modern Age
In the Post-Crisis DC Universe, Brainiac's history was completely rewritten. The Post-Crisis version of Brainiac was now a radical Coluan scientist called Vril Dox who, having attempted to overthrow the Computer Tyrants of Colu, was sentenced to death. In his last moments before disintegration, his consciousness was attracted light years away to Milton Moses Fine, a human sideshow mentalist who worked under the alias "The Amazing Brainiac". Needing cranial fluid to maintain his possession of Fine, Dox went on a murder spree. He discovered that Fine had genuine psychic powers and was thus a metahuman, which he frequently wielded against Superman.

"Panic in the Sky"
In 1990, Brainiac is able to take over the minds of several LexCorp staffers. He makes the scientists create a new version of the skull ship (saying he thought of the design "in a dream") and use advanced genetic science to grow a new body for himself, resembling Milton Fine's form but taller, more physically fit, and with the green skin of a Coluan. He also has a new braincase helmet that resembles his Silver Age diodes. Now free of Fine's body and consciousness completely but still possessing the man's metahuman telepathic powers, Brainiac confronted Superman and then left Earth to plan another attack.

Brainiac returned in the "Panic in the Sky" storyline after seizing control of the mobile planetary fortress Warworld and recruiting assistance from Maxima and the alien warrior Draaga. Discovering a lost and confused Matrix (an artificial life form who at this time operates as Supergirl), Brainiac brainwashes her into becoming his soldier. He clashes with the New Gods and then launches a pre-emptive strike on Earth. Rather than wait for an invasion, Superman gathers a large group of superheroes and allies, one team attacking Warworld directly while the other remains on Earth to counter further attacks. Through duplicates of his braincase, Brainiac briefly takes control of some of Earth's heroes, but ultimately he fails. Supergirl and the other heroes are freed from mental control and the villain is rendered catatonic. His vegetative body is taken back to New Genesis for observation.

"Dead Again"
A year after the seeming death and then return of Superman, a dead body matching the Kryptonian's appearance is found in his abandoned tomb, leading some to wonder if the hero's return was a deception. It is revealed that Brainiac is no longer on New Genesis but revived and returned to Earth, leaving behind an illusion that he remained in a coma. While hidden, he created more delusions to turn the public against Superman and make the hero question his own sanity. The two battle and Superman taunts the villain by insisting he is just Milton Moses Fine, a cheap entertainer. Fine's personality seemingly emerges and shuts down the Brainiac persona. Fine was then escorted off to a psychiatric facility.

The Doomsday Wars
During a later skirmish with Superman, Fine's body is irreparably damaged, leaving Brainiac with only a short time to live. With help from a new Coluan assistant named Prin Vnok, Brainiac retrieves Doomsday, the monster that seemingly killed Superman before, and uses him as a new host body. Now a cunning psychic with a super-strong, near-indestructible body, Brainiac attacks the Justice League. But Doomsday's own raging mind fights back and Brainiac realizes he still needs a suitable host. Hoping to create a clone Doomsday form by manipulating human DNA, Brainiac attempts to steal a prematurely born baby Superman is transporting to a Neo-Natal Intensive Care Unit, the newborn child of Pete Ross and Lana Lang. Brainiac sees this as an opportunity for revenge, correctly concluding that Ross and Lang are close to him. Using a 'psi-blocker' device, Superman thwarts Brianiac's plans and the villain is forced to house his consciousness within a completely robotic body. Dubbing his new form Brainiac 2.5, the villain fears he is now trapped in this form.

Brainiac 13

At the turn of the millennium, Brainiac 2.5 revealed that he had placed a sleeper virus in LexCorp's Y2K bug safeguards. This virus was intended to dramatically boost his abilities. However, the virus instead allowed his upgraded future self, Brainiac 13 (or "B-13"), to travel from the 64th century to the present day and take control of Brainiac 2.5's body.

Brainiac 13 then began transforming Metropolis into the 64th-century version of the city, which he controlled, and also began upgrading Metallo into a giant-sized version of himself. Brainiac 13 then took control of several android superheroes, such as the Red Tornado and Hourman, and used them against Superman. The Metal Men's responsometers were able to protect them from his programming, and allowed them to help defeat Metallo.

During a fight with the Eradicator (who was attempting to 'hijack' the B13 virus and use it for its own ends), Superman discovered that Brainiac 13 could not cope with Kryptonian technology, due to incompatibility issues. This gave Superman a plan to stop Brainiac 13's scheme. With the aid of the rebuilt Kelex, Superman tricked Luthor into connecting a Kryptonian battlesuit to one of Brainiac 13's power conduits. Kelex then reactivated the Red Tornado to help Superman break Brainiac 13 down into his respective nanobots and trap him in the suit.

Brainiac 13 was able to work with Brainiac 2.5—now transferred into the aged body of Lena Luthor—and prepared a tactic against Imperiex for the upcoming Imperiex War. The Brainiacs successfully engineered Imperiex's defeat, allowing Brainiac 13 to absorb Imperiex's power and use it to overpower the combined heroes and villains of the universe while simultaneously devastating both Earth and Apokolips. Brainiac 13 planned to use the power he stole from Imperiex to conquer the universe and reshape it in his image, and is made so powerful by the absorption that none of the heroes, not even Superman, can hope to damage him. However, with help from Lex's temporal displacement technology and Darkseid's Boom Tube technology boosted by magic supplied by Tempest and the Amazons, Superman was able to destroy Brainiac 13 and Imperiex by sending them through a temporal Boom tube where they were annihilated in the Big Bang. Brainiac 13 had his body disintegrated and the remnants of his mind scattered across sixty trillion light years, finally killing the chronologically last known version of Brainiac.

After the death of Brainiac 13, Superman discovered that the version of Krypton he previously visited via the Phantom Zone was, in fact, a trap created by Brainiac 13. Having been defeated by Kryptonian technology, Brainiac 13 had traveled back in time to the real Krypton prior to its destruction. There, he stole the Eradicator matrix and Jor-El's diaries, and created a false Krypton based on Jor-El's favorite period in history.

Sometime later, Superman traveled into the future and battled Brainiac 12. He learned that everything Brainiac 13 did in the past was designed to ensure things reached the point where Brainiac 13 would be created. Brainiac 12's defeat before his upgrade apparently reversed the advances Brainiac 13 had made to Metropolis.

The Insiders

Around the time of the Graduation Day event, a future version of Brainiac, called Brainiac 6, used his "granddaughter", Brainiac 8 (also known as Indigo), to kill Donna Troy to ensure the fate of Colu. Indigo then infiltrated the Outsiders until she attacked the team, along with Brainiac 6 and his allies, Lex Luthor, and a brainwashed Superboy, who had attacked the Teen Titans. In the ensuing battle, Indigo died and Superboy broke away from the brainwashing, while Luthor escaped. While his ship was destroyed, Brainiac's condition and whereabouts after the battle are unknown.

Silver Age Brainiac in the Post-Crisis universe
Later stories revealed that elements of Brainiac's Pre-Crisis history occurred in the Post-Crisis character's history prior to his possession of Milton Moses Fine and his first encounter with Superman. The citizens of Kandor recall that Brainiac stole their city from Krypton, and not the alien wizard Tolos.

History of the DC Universe mentions his defeat by the Omega Men, although this is not seen in Crisis on Infinite Earths itself, and noted a second Brainiac was created in a laboratory on Earth two years later. In the Silver Age: JLA one-shot, the Injustice League discovered numerous shrunken alien cities found in Brainiac's abandoned spaceship.

Brainiac's updated mechanical form

Brainiac later reappeared as a swarm of interlinked nanotechnological units. Its operation was to sabotage a Waynetech research facility accomplished by infecting Metallo with a computer virus and controlling him from orbit. Superman and Batman tracked Brainiac's signal to an orbital facility and attacked. Brainiac's nanoswarm body was destroyed, though he had infected the Metal Men during their previous encounter with Metallo. Brainiac proceeded to use them to acquire a prototype OMAC unit, which Bruce Wayne had developed through the use of Brainiac 13 nanotechnology. Superman and Batman destroyed the OMAC body with the aid of the Metal Men, after the Metal Men overcame Brainiac's control.

Return

Following revisions to Superman's continuity in Infinite Crisis and Action Comics #850, Brainiac reappeared in a self-titled five-part story arc in Action Comics. In Action Comics #866 (August 2008), a Brainiac robot probe (resembling his skeleton-esque Pre-Crisis incarnation, and mistaken for the real Brainiac by Clark) arrives on Earth and battles Superman. After the probe is defeated, information about Superman's blood is sent to the original Brainiac. As Brainiac wakes up, his computer announces "Attempt #242 in progress", a reference to Brainiac's first appearance in Action Comics #242, and to the many encounters between Brainiac and Superman. In the following issue, Supergirl reveals to Superman that Brainiac shrunk the Kryptonian city of Kandor and placed it in a bottle, and that all previous incarnations of Brainiac that Superman has encountered were just probes, clones, and nanite-controlled bodies. She notes that no one has ever actually seen Brainiac. Inspired by Supergirl's story, Superman attempts to find Brainiac and stop him. He heads to a world under attack by Brainiac just in time to be caught in a supernova as Brainiac destroys the system's star and the populated world along with it. The supernova knocks Superman out, and he is caught and brought onto Brainiac's ship.

Superman escapes from his imprisonment and sees Brainiac emerging from his "bio-shell". This version of Brainiac resembles a much larger and more muscular version of the original, Pre-Crisis Brainiac, and has motives similar to the Superman: The Animated Series incarnation of the character in that he travels the universe and steals the knowledge of various alien cultures, abducting and shrinking cities from each planet as samples, and then destroys the planet so that the value of the destroyed civilization's knowledge is increased. Superman attacks Brainiac, but Brainiac manages to overpower the Man of Steel before restraining him with the help of his ship's internal systems. Brainiac inserts the subdued Superman into a machine that allows him to read the Kryptonian's mind, with the intent of assimilating his brain. Brainiac's ship then travels to Earth and prepares to abduct the city of Metropolis.

Brainiac successfully steals Metropolis, and prepares to fire a missile that will destroy the Sun and the Earth itself. Supergirl ends up captured along with the rest of Metropolis, but Superman breaks out of his restraints again and frees her. Supergirl stops the missile, while Superman battles Brainiac. Brainiac appears to have the advantage in physical combat yet again, but Superman knocks Brainiac out of his ship and into a swamp, where Brainiac is overwhelmed by the microscopic organisms covering his body. Superman uses this distraction to defeat Brainiac. While Superman frees the cities of Metropolis and Kandor, the villain launches a missile to the Kent farm in an act of spite. The farm is destroyed, and Jonathan Kent suffers a fatal heart attack because of it. Brainiac is brought to a top-secret military base, where the imprisoned Lex Luthor is assigned to discover his secrets. Luthor eventually manages to use Brainiac's connection to his ship to kill the soldiers assigned to watch him. Brainiac manages to free himself from Luthor's control, forcing him on board the ship, and the two make their escape.

Notably, upon learning of Brainiac's modus operandi of destroying planets by destabilizing nearby stars when he is done collecting cities and knowledge from said planets, Superman openly speculates that Brainiac destroyed Krypton, which was destroyed when its sun went nova soon after Brainiac abducted Kandor and Argo. He also asks the alien what he did to Krypton's sun. Brainiac ignores the query, neither confirming or denying his responsibility, though he does heavily imply it ("In fifty-seven minutes, my solar aggressor will reach your sun. It will flare up, and the Earth will be incinerated. Just like Krypton."). Superman still believes Brainiac had a part in Krypton's destruction after the end of this story arc.

New Krypton

Following this, Brainiac, now in possession of his ship again, unleashes his robot army against the newly created planet of New Krypton, and the Kryptonian citizens rise up to fight the drones. General Zod's army proves totally unable to fend them off, as the Brainiac's ship's force fields are seemingly invulnerable and his drones are equipped with red sunray guns, allowing them to kill tens of thousands of Kryptonians. Superman, being the only one who knows how to penetrate his force fields (having learned the trick in the previous story arc), manages to enter Brainiac's ship. Supergirl leads the Kryptonians against the drones, but is attacked by an anti-Kryptonian Brainiac probe. Superboy, Mon-El, and the Legion of Super-Heroes join the fight and save Supergirl.

After this, Brainiac shrinks Kandor again and re-bottles it, including a miniature red sun to de-power all the Kryptonians inside. The Legion, Supergirl, Superboy, Zod, and Superman all make it on to Brainiac's ship, thanks to Brainiac 5 hacking his ancestor's force fields and allowing them entry. The Legion explains to Zod that, just as Krypton's city of Kandor is held in a bottle onboard Brainiac's ship, other planets' cities are also imprisoned, and, therefore, Zod cannot destroy Brainiac's ship until the cities can be rescued. Zod sends Supergirl off and then arrests the Legionnaires, branding them terrorists. Meanwhile, Superman is about to face off against Brainiac when he is knocked down by a kryptonite energy blast fired by Lex Luthor and subsequently captured. Brainiac locks him in captivity with the intent to experiment on him, but Superman escapes and meets up with the rest of the superheroes and Zod on a separate section of the ship. Zod enters the scene and engages Brainiac in combat while Supergirl, Superboy, and the Legion recover the bottled cities on Brainiac's ship, including Kandor. Zod seems to be losing his fight with Brainiac, when suddenly Superman gets up and tackles Brainiac from behind. Before the battle between the two Kryptonians and the villain can continue, Brainiac's ship starts to destabilize and descend towards the planet. It is revealed that Lex Luthor sabotaged the ship and re-sized one of the cities while inside.

Luthor's intervention causes the ship to crash into New Krypton, destroying it while Supergirl and the Legion re-size Kandor. However, the city that Luthor expanded is still growing, now putting Kandor at risk. As Brainiac 5 works on the problem, Supergirl is shocked to discover Superman impaled by pieces of Brainiac's ship as a result of the explosion. Superman appears to have been fatally stricken. Luthor, though reeling from the explosion, is pleased with all the destruction he has caused. Brainiac confronts Luthor in the ruins of the ship and is furious that Lex sabotaged his ship. Luthor mocks him and spits in his eye before Brainiac angrily snaps Luthor's neck, killing him.

Now deprived of his ship and technology, and seemingly depowered by his ship's destruction, Brainiac finds himself faced by an entire city of angry, solar-powered Kryptonians. Zod is eager for a final showdown with Brainiac, who calls Zod a coward for confronting Brainiac with his powers intact and an army of super-powered Kryptonians at his back. In response, Zod fires the red sun radiation from an Archer rifle at himself, to remove his powers and thus supposedly level the playing field as he prepares to take Brainiac down. Brainiac 5 gives Superman a transfusion of Conner's blood and exposes him to a large dose of concentrated yellow sun rays, successfully reviving him.

Despite the loss of his powers, Zod is able to get the upper hand on the similarly powerless Brainiac and force him to his knees. Zod is about to shoot Brainiac when Superman intervenes. This causes a heated argument between Superman and Zod. Zod commands his soldiers to restrain Kal-El so Zod can proceed with the execution of Brainiac. Brainiac 5, sensing that this is his moment of destiny, steps in and teleports himself and Brainiac off of New Krypton.

It is revealed that Lex used a Luthor robot, supplied by the Toyman, to accomplish his mission on New Krypton, and that Brainiac killed the robot instead. Lex is very much alive and discussing with General Lane how his objective, to bring chaos to New Krypton, was achieved. Lex has been working as an agent of General Lane all along. The disarray that Lex caused provides Lane with a window of opportunity as he prepares for the impending war with New Krypton. Lex receives a Presidential pardon for his efforts. The story ends with Zod rallying his people as he declares war on the planet Earth. The story concludes in the next miniseries, Superman: War of the Supermen.

Mon-El plants the many bottled cities that Brainiac has captured over the years on various planets across the galaxy. These cities will one day become the United Planets by the 31st century, the same planets that will produce the members of the Legion of Super-Heroes.

Brainiac 5 takes Brainiac to their homeworld of Colu where he hands him over to Vril Dox, a.k.a. Brainiac 2. Vril Dox happily turns his "father" over to his people for his crimes. However Lyrl Dox, a.k.a. Brainiac 3, releases his "grandfather" with a weapon called Pulsar Stargrave. What then occurs is an all-out battle for Colu between all three present-day Brainiacs. Vril Dox even calls in Lobo for help. Brainac breaks out of his prison and, after causing much damage on Colu, escapes with Pulsar Stargrave in tow for parts unknown.

The New 52
Brainiac's origin in The New 52 is revealed in Superman #23.2. Vril Dox was acknowledged as the greatest scientist on his homeworld, Yod-Colu, given his advances in force field technology and miniaturization. He developed an artificial intelligence, C.O.M.P.U.T.O., allowing him to discover the fifth dimension. Dox discovered the fifth dimension was in a state of war, and a group of its inhabitants, the Multitude, had entered their dimension and destroyed over a hundred planets. Realizing Yod-Colu was next in the Multitude's path, Dox tried to find a way to save his planet, even performing experiments on his son. The magistrates of Yod-Colu sentenced Dox to exile, but Dox used C.O.M.P.U.T.O. to take control of Yod-Colu's computer networks. Copying the planet's database, Dox constructed an army of robot servants called Terminauts and miniaturized the city his wife and son lived on and bottled it in a force field, while the rest of Yod-Colu was destroyed by the Multitude.

After the destruction of Yod-Colu, Dox constructed an army of starships and distributed his consciousness across a series of robots that would each travel the universe to preserve planets from the Multitude, becoming known as the Collector of Worlds. One of these robots attacked Krypton. Dox became fascinated by Jor-El, a Kryptonian scientist who actually saved his homeworld from the Multitude. Upon returning to Krypton, however, Dox discovered Krypton had been destroyed.

Referred to at first as 'The Collector of Worlds', Brainiac is first seen as the mysterious informant that supplies Lex Luthor information of Superman and his alien nature. Clark is having a dream of Krypton's final moments in which an artificial intelligence that controls the planet wakes up robots in an attempt to preserve the Kryptonian culture. Later, while Clark conducts an interview in a robotic factory, the same harvester robots appear.

John Corben (the soon-to-be supervillain Metallo) is suddenly possessed by the artificial intelligence. It demands Superman. The robots create havoc throughout Metropolis, but Superman soon realizes that they are really after him. Superman fights the possessed Corben with the help of John Henry Irons.

Although they managed to defeat him, the alien sentience had already miniaturized and bottled the city of Metropolis and took it to his ship in space. Superman travels to the ship to find many alien bottled cities, Kandor included. The alien identifies himself as a being from the planet Colu where he was known as C.O.M.P.U.T.O and on Krypton he was called Brainiac 1.0. He claims that, without Superman and the ship that brought him to Earth, his Kryptonian collection is incomplete. The alien intelligence demands Superman make a choice: the intelligence will disable life support in both the Kandor and Metropolis bottles, and Superman must choose which city to save using indestructible Kryptonian armor found on the ship.

Superman decides on neither and wears the armor (which changes instantly into the current Superman costume design). Brainiac sends Metallo to attack Superman, but due to Superman reasoning with him over his feelings for Lois Lane, he breaks free of Brainiac's control and joins Superman in his attack. Superman then uses his rocket from Krypton that had also been miniaturized with Metropolis to attack Brainiac's mind, which the rocket was able to do since its primary mission was to protect Kal-El. In doing so, Metropolis was returned to Earth and Superman took possession of Brainiac's ship and made it his new super citadel.

Notably, the ship Clark was placed into as a child was described as having "Brainiac AI", leaving the identity of the Collector of Worlds in doubt. The Colony of the Collector of Worlds told Superman that its AI technology went by different names, beginning on Yod-Colu as C.O.M.P.U.T.O. On Noma, he was called Pneumenoid; on Bryak it was Mind2; on Krypton he was called Brainiac 1.0; and, finally on Earth, he is the Internet.

After this defeat, Brainiac retreated to deeper parts of the cosmos, and eventually came across the planet Tolerance, the setting of a bounty hunting glimmernet game show called The Hunted. Striking a deal with Lady Styx, overlord of the Tenebrian Dominion, he bottles a portion of the Sh'diki Borough of Tolerance to add to his collection. He encounters Jediah Caul, a former member of the Green Lantern Corps, who combats and infects Brainiac's ship. Ultimately, Brainiac abandons his plans with the Sh'diki Borough and ejects Caul and the bottled city before leaving for parts unknown.

Convergence

Back on Earth, during an investigation of 20 kidnapped people who developed metahuman powers after being kidnapped by Brainiac, one of these 20 infects Lois Lane, thereby giving Brainiac control over a close ally of Superman. Brainiac plots his return to Earth, using Lane to infiltrate Earth's defense systems to allow an easier path for his physical return. and even upgrading her body to contain his 12th level intelligence. His minion Cyborg-Superman (a reconstructed Zor-El, father of Supergirl) constructs a portal to allow Brainiac's command ship and "daughter ships" to travel to Earth from throughout the galaxy.

Superman, whom Brainiac had conspired to 'infect' with the monster Doomsday to drive him away from Earth, uses his augmented power to attack Brainiac's gigantic mothership and break through to its core and, finally, Vril Dox himself. The Coluan appears still-humanoid, and explains his reasoning for stealing minds from throughout the universe: he has concluded that if he can 'unite' the minds of a certain critical number of people, he will be able to change reality itself. His motivation for this appears a desire to right the wrongs he feels responsible for: the loss of his wife and child back on Colu. His plan is undone when Superman drags him, mothership and all, into a black hole. But then, Vril Dox is snatched away to safety, it seems, by a being who appears to be the true Brainiac: an immensely powerful entity from outside the universe itself.

This version of Brainiac, a composite of Brainiac from around the Multiverse, is revealed to be the pre-Flashpoint era Brainiac who, having found his way into the Source Wall and into the Multiverse, was thrown back in the timestream and mutated by the effects of "crisis" events such as Crisis on Infinite Earths, Zero Hour, and 52, creating a godlike being. He then uncovered the location of Vanishing Point from nearly killing New 52 Earth-0's Michelle Carter, from which he could roam the complete history of the Multiverse, collecting doomed cities from defunct timelines, alternative futures, and parallel worlds to add to his collection, in Convergence, leaving behind an agent, Telos, to rule a planet of the same name containing the cities. Brainiac's attempt to do this to a future timeline of Earth-0 was narrowly averted by the heroes in the story The New 52: Futures End; Brainiac was contained in a T-sphere, leaving Telos stranded without his master, prompting the events of Convergence in which the planets are bid to fight each other. When the events of Convergence nearly end in an irreversible destruction of the Multiverse, the time traveller Waverider, formerly the pre-Flashpoint Booster Gold, frees Brainiac, who reveals he is sick from his mutations and only wishes to return to normal, to being Brainiac of Colu. He sends most of the heroes home, and with help from the Zero Hour Parallax and the pre-Flashpoint Superman, averts the collapse of the Multiverse from Crisis on Infinite Earths, and is returned to the normal Brainiac. His actions also allow various parallel universes and alternate timelines to exist as the new Multiverse.

Green Lantern Corps
Brainiac's name is first referenced in an issue of Hal Jordan and the Green Lantern Corps. The entirety of the Green and Yellow Lanterns (including Hal Jordan, Guy Gardner, and John Stewart), along with Starro the Conqueror, are lured into a trap and subsequently hit with a shrink ray while on the planet Xudar, leaving them tiny and helpless. In the next issue, they are trapped in a bottle, and their jailer is revealed to be a robot claiming to run on "Brainiac 2.0" software. The robot heavily resembles both Brainiac's 1983 skeleton-esque incarnation and the robotic drones utilized by the post-2008 version of Brainiac. It has a collection of shrunken bottled planets, and travels in a ship resembling Brainiac's skullship. At the time it was not clear if this was the true Brainiac after Rebirth or yet another one of his drones.

The machine's victory is short-lived, however, as it is revealed that Larfleeze was able to reprogram it to his side using an Orange Lantern ring, having rebooted its life systems after finding it inactive on his homeworld with its ship. Larfleeze is impressed that the machine was able to capture the Green Lanterns and Starro, and even more impressed with the machine's shrinking technology, and plans to hijack its technology to put together his own collection. He takes the ship and collection to his homeworld of Okaara. However, upon being informed that the Yellow and Green Lanterns are still fighting inside the bottle and trying to kill each other, Larfleeze's own greed for having everything gets the best of him and he ends up breaking the container. This frees the Lanterns, and somehow restores them to their normal size and strength, after which they immediately start rampaging inside the ship and trashing Brainiac/Larfleeze's collection. Hal, Kyle, John and Guy go on to lead the attack on the Orange Lantern Corps. With everyone fighting together, the Orange Lantern Corps are quickly overwhelmed. Larfleeze accuses the robot of playing him; when it responds that it simply did what he programmed it to do, Larfleeze destroys it in a rage.

The Superman storyline "New World" later confirmed via a flashback cameo that the Post-Crisis, post-2008 version of Brainiac (the tall, muscular, green-skinned cybernetic alien scientist) still exists in the post-Rebirth continuity, and has encountered Superman in the past. Thus, the robot that defeated Starro, the Green Lantern Corps, and the Yellow Lantern Corps before subsequently being dispatched by Larfleeze was, in fact, one of his drones.

No Justice
Brainiac later arrived on Earth again and battled the Justice League, who proved no match for him and his ship, until Superman arrived. However, he did not come to destroy the Earth, but to deliver a warning: that there is a cosmic-level threat in the universe coming to Earth, one that the heroes of Earth are woefully ill-prepared for. Brainiac thinks he can defeat the threat, but it means teaming up with Superman and the Justice League and combining members of the League with some of the most dangerous supervillains in the DC Universe and sending them into battle against this extinction-level menace. Four teams outfitted with Brainiac's technology are formed (including among other members, Lex Luthor, Batman, Wonder Woman, and Sinestro), with Brainiac himself working directly alongside his nemesis, Superman.

The No Justice miniseries begins with the Omega Titans, the aforementioned threat, attacking Colu, Brainiac's homeworld, which explains Brainiac's kidnapping of Earth's superheroes and supervillains. Brainiac claims to have developed a plan to defeat the Omega Titans and the superheroes only need to follow his orders to win, but Amanda Waller uses the hidden Protocol XI, which involves kidnapping the world's most dangerous psychics, to probe Brainiac's mind and find out what he knows. The strain of the psychic attack causes Brainiac's head to explode, apparently killing him.

In Scott Snyder's Justice League run, to fill in the gap left by Black Manta and the Joker, Lex Luthor sets Professor Ivo to work reconstructing Brainiac, with the intention of him joining the Legion of Doom. Despite teaming up with them, Brainiac does have his own motivations, including planning his revenge against Waller.

Brainiac 6
He is the gang version of Brainiac and first appears in Adventures of the Super Sons #1.

Powers, abilities, and equipment
Brainiac's most consistent power (endemic to all versions) is his "twelfth-level intelligence", allowing calculation abilities, enhanced memory, and advanced understanding of mechanical engineering, bioengineering, physics, and as well as other theoretical and applied sciences. For comparison, the population of 20th century Earth constitutes a sixth-level intelligence, while the population of 31st century Earth are a ninth-level intelligence. His Post-Crisis incarnation claims that his brain can process and sort knowledge of over four hundred ninety octodecillion beings (4.9 × 1059), which is an enormous number, about five billion times the estimated number of atoms on Earth. All the different versions have created devices such as a force field belt capable of withstanding Superman's most powerful blows, and a shrink ray capable of reducing cities.

Brainiac's advanced mental powers have shown him capable of possessing others, absorbing information from other beings, transferring his consciousness, creating and manipulating computer systems, replicating duplicate bodies for himself, and exerting powers to traverse or control spacetime. Among organic beings, Brainiac views only his frequent partner Lex Luthor as a peer intellect. Brainiac is usually depicted with incredibly high levels of strength, durability, and speed; the exact level varies, but usually hovers at around Superman's strength. Brainiac's exact abilities vary drastically throughout his various incarnations.

Pre-Crisis
Originally, Brainiac was a scientist with no superhuman abilities aside from his intellect. He fought Superman via the use of his advanced technology and cunning, similar to Lex Luthor. Among these were a force field belt that protects him from all harm, a shrink ray to capture and bottle cities (even Metropolis), and a headpiece consisting of a cluster of diode/electrode-like objects. His cybernetic headpiece lets him interface with technology and discharge energy blasts from his head, which were powerful enough to significantly harm Superman. The Man of Steel described these blasts as "blindingly painful... almost unbearable" and a threat to his life. When the Crisis on Infinite Earths struck, Brainiac could detect the lies of others by reading their thoughts.  The Pre-Crisis Brainiac was referred to by an omniscient narrator as "the super-computer space pirate-- Superman's most powerful nemesis."

Brainiac as an unpowered being reliant on external weaponry was largely still the case even after he was retconned as an android, but in the 1980s, everything changed. This was when he gained the abilities that would persist through all subsequent incarnations: super physical attributes, intelligence, and technopathy. His technopatic abilities extend to control of his ship, with which he shares a symbiotic relationship. He is capable of downloading his consciousness to spare robotic bodies in the event the original is destroyed or damaged. Brainiac can also possess organic beings under certain circumstances, as he did to Luthor during Whatever Happened to the Man of Tomorrow?.

The final body utilized by the Pre-Crisis Brainiac (resembling a robotic skeleton) was technopathic, superhumanly strong, and resilient, and was capable of generating and "spinning" psychokinetic energies into a web-like net which could hold even Superman at bay. Among the knowledge he absorbed was extensive information of hand-to-hand combat techniques, making him a highly skilled combatant. Despite this, he saw physical confrontation as beneath him, and preferred to defeat foes with his mind.

Post-Crisis

Probes
John Byrne's re-imagining of the character has telepathy and telekinesis, as well as extensive knowledge of various alien technologies. He was an artificial intelligence who had inhabited the body of a human psychic and awakened his powers, further enhancing them with an implanted electrode headpiece. His vast psychic powers allowed him to seriously challenge Superman and defeat many members of the New Gods (including Orion) with a single blast, but this body's lack of durability is the major liability and eventually led to it being rendered useless in a gasoline explosion. After the organic body was destroyed, his consciousness built and possessed multiple robotic bodies, and occasionally hijacks other organic bodies (such as Doomsday's). His abilities were dependent on the body he was inhabiting at the time, in which could vary from weak as normal to far stronger than abnormal. His nanoswarm incarnation, known as Brainiac 2.5 for instance, can shapeshift, regenerate, bend technology to his whim, project energy blasts and force fields, and match Superman blow for blow; Superman stated Brainiac to have physical strength on par with Doomsday in this form. His strongest incarnation was Brainiac 13, who, even prior to absorbing Imperiex, was so physically formidable that Superman cannot remotely affect, much less damage him. By contrast, Brainiac could easily kill Superman in a short time, if he have not been devoted to torture the Man of Steel.

True form
It was later revealed that this version of Brainiac (like the previous ones) is merely a mentally-controlled probe. The real Brainiac, who was a living Coluan, had himself both genetically and cybernetically modified. The true Brainiac lacked psychic powers, but still have abilities identical to his original incarnations. He possesses a level of strength and durability far greater than Superman; capable of easily overpowering the Kryptonian in unarmed combat, and withstanding several consecutive blows to the face from Superman without visible harm.  His speed is vastly surpassing, so fast that he once caught a punch thrown by the Man of Steel. At one point, Brainiac 5 warns Superman that he would most likely die against Brainiac in a straight fight.   

Despite his massive biomechanical modifications, Brainiac has a few weaknesses. Like the Pre-Crisis Brainiac, he is telepathically linked to his ship in such way that if separation of it without warning can disable him for a short period. But, prolonged periods causes him to physically deteriorate and become less powerful; just as Lex Luthor observed this while studying his unconscious body over course of several days when it was in custody of the U.S. government. Initially, he is only overloaded in particularly dirty environments and human society via mysophobia while landing into the Earth's atmosphere. Though, Brainiac does not seem to have this defect on Earth in his later battles, such as defeating Superboy. Suggesting that he fixed it.

This Brainiac is an incredibly experienced fighter, but like his Pre-Crisis counterpart is most dangerous due to the advanced technology he wields, much of it of his own invention. These include his classic shrink ray and force field belt, and other gadgets such as missiles capable of causing stars to go into a premature supernova state. His force fields are so impregnable that a direct hit from an energy weapon killed several solar-powered Kryptonians as collateral damage and didn't leave so much a single scratch on his ship. Brainiac also possesses an army of at least ten or thousand humanoid robotic "probes". These probes are strong enough to draw more blood from Superman and tough enough to survive some of his powerful blows. During the New Krypton story arc, Brainiac upgraded his drones with red-sun ray guns for the purpose of fighting fully powered Kryptonians. When Brainiac orders them to attack New Krypton, they quickly kill over eleven thousand Kryptonians.

He is a bionically engineered cyborg who wants to acquire more knowledge and become "better". With his ship, twelfth-level intellect, and powerful technology, Brainiac has captured a thousand cities, absorbed all the information, and destroyed many worlds. Making him into the most feared being in that known universe.

The New 52
Brainiac, in The New 52, seems to have kept most of the powers and equipment of his Post-Crisis incarnation (including his shrink ray, force field belt, and robot army), with notable additions. Brainiac's ship has been massively upgraded in this incarnation; it is now larger than the entire planetary system, and carries within a huge invasion fleet of smaller ships in numerous types. He still appears to possess the physical strength, near-invulnerability, and fast speed of his Post-Crisis counterpart, as shown when he easily defeats Zor-El. By the Superman: Doomed story arc, Brainiac utilizes his vast intellect to become an enormously powerful psychic, augmented by the alien minds that he had stolen and digitized from across every galaxy. Then, he is capable of taking control of eight billion minds on Earth at the same time. He also demonstrates considerable mental abilities, claiming that their combined brainwaves throughout the universe can allow him to alter reality at will. He plans on using this newfound power to remake it into own his image. However, Brainiac's plan prematurely ended when Superman battles him telepathically and crashes his ship into a black hole.

Following the Doomed story arc, it is further revealed that this Pre-Crisis Brainiac somehow escaped and mutated from the Crisis on Infinite Earths itself ever since. Becoming a god-like being, this version of Brainiac is virtually omnipotent with the ability to warp universes and time travel. Using this New 52 incarnation as one of his probes, he either created or interacted with different iterations of himself throughout the whole multiverse. Brainiac has grown so much in power that he can collect cities from other universes at will. At the end of the Convergence story arc, he recreates the DC Multiverse.

Other versions
The character has been depicted in various out-of-continuity stories. In the Amalgam Comics line, which was a joint venture between DC and Marvel Comics, readers are introduced to Galactiac, a combination of Brainiac and Marvel Comics antagonist Galactus. Brainiac also appears in Superman: Red Son, JLA: Shogun of Steel, and the novel The Last Days of Krypton by author Kevin J. Anderson.

Superman: Red Son
In the Superman: Red Son graphic novel, Brainiac (here depicted as an alien AI) serves as the main antagonist. He first appears working with Luthor in 1978 to undermine Superman, eventually shrinking and bottling the city of Stalingrad. Superman defeats Brainiac soon after, but his inability to restore Stalingrad becomes his one failure and a recurring source of guilt. After his defeat, Superman has Brainiac reprogrammed to serve him and the Earth, helping run Superman's Global Soviet Union, a task he performs for four decades. While serving Superman, Brainiac repeatedly advises him to take more drastic courses of action to resolve his problems, such as suggesting he merely invade Luthor's United States, though Superman always rebuffs his most extreme suggestions.

At the climax of the story, after Luthor infiltrates his capitol, Superman does decide to invade the United States, defeating a futuristic US Pacific Fleet and an army of superbeings (including Wonder Woman, Green Lantern and Doomsday). Luthor is yanked down deep into the recesses of the Fortress by Brainiac to be converted surgically into a Superman robot. Brainiac and Superman storm the White House after defeating all the US's defenders. They are greeted by Lois Luthor with the last weapon, a small note written by President Lex Luthor that reads, "Why don't you just put the whole world in a bottle, Superman?". Superman, realizing the error of his ways, is horrified by the revelation that he has essentially become another Brainiac — "an alien bullying a less-developed species." He calls off the invasion, but Brainiac objects; he reveals that his twelfth-level intellect let him easily subvert any attempts at reprogramming him, and that he has never been under Superman's control. He attacks Superman with a kryptonite beam weapon, nearly killing him while boasting about how he will conquer the entire universe after finishing off all his foes on Earth. However, Brainiac is defeated when Luthor (having escaped surgery through undisclosed means) hacks and shuts off Brainiac from the inside. Brainiac's body is promptly destroyed by Superman.

In one last act of spite, Brainiac's death automatically triggers his ship's self-destruct, which, according to Luthor, would eradicate the entire Earth and everything within a  radius. As the gravitational singularities powering Brainiac's ship threaten to explode, Superman rockets it into outer space, where it explodes. The Earth is saved, but Superman is thought to have been caught in an explosion and killed. In the epilogue at Lex Luthor's funeral a thousand years in the future, it is revealed that unbeknownst to the rest of the Earth, Superman survived the destruction of Brainiac's ship. He walks quietly away from the ceremony, planning to live among humans rather than ruling over them.

JLA: Earth-2
In the JLA: Earth 2 one-shot, the Justice League are drawn to the anti-matter universe to defeat the Crime Syndicate of America, their villainous anti-matter counterparts, with Brainiac apparently acting as the robotic servant of Ultraman. However, after the Syndicate travel to the League's universe, it is revealed that the true mastermind of the scheme was Brainiac, who is revealed to be an organic life form trapped in a tank acting as Ultraman's servant, since Ultraman captured Brainiac's HQ "The Flying Fortress" having manipulated both teams into a position where they will be trapped in each other's worlds and thus unable to win, as the god of each world means that 'good' and 'evil' will always win in each world. However, Brainiac is defeated when the League deliberately deserts: so that the Syndicate can return in time to stop him.

Batman: The Dark Knight Strikes Again
In Batman: The Dark Knight Strikes Again, set in a world where heroes have been publicly 'retired' for years as Lex Luthor took over and blackmailed assorted heroes into acting as his discreet 'servants', Brainiac is working with Luthor to keep the city of Kandor contained, the two destroying one Kryptonian family each time Superman defies them. He is eventually loved by Lara, the daughter of Superman and Wonder Woman, who claims to be surrendering to him only to allow the Atom to break the bottle from inside and allow the Kryptonians within to access their powers, decimating Brainiac with their heat vision.

Bizarro Brainiac
Bizarro #1 created this doppelganger of Brainiac to live on Bizarro World. Since Brainiac shrunk the city of Kandor, his Bizarro counterpart felt compelled to do the opposite, and expanded a city in Antarctica, creating Big City.

Flashpoint
In the alternate timeline of the Flashpoint event, Brainiac is the ruler of 31st century Earth, and has captured Kid Flash, whom he then placed in stasis, but Hot Pursuit managed to rescue the young speedster. Escaping from Brainiac's base, Kid Flash and Hot Pursuit formulate a plan to return to the 21st century. Kid Flash then allows himself to be recaptured by Brainiac and put into stasis. Kid Flash uses his super-speed in the virtual reality

Justice League/Power Rangers
Brainiac is one of the villains in the Justice League/Power Rangers crossover, when the Power Rangers and Lord Zedd accidentally travel to the DC Universe through a teleportation accident, with the Rangers arriving in Gotham City, while Zedd finds himself in one of the trapped cities on Brainiac's ship. Escaping from the bottle, Zedd proposes an alliance with Brainiac in exchange for providing Brainiac with a city from his Earth, Zedd releasing a wave of monsters across the world to distract the Justice League. Using the distraction of Zedd's monsters, Brainiac dispatches his drones to take control of the Rangers' zords, stealing their powers and fleeing back to their world, forcing the Rangers and the Justice League to 'borrow' the Large Hadron Collider to create a temporary dimensional transporter that will allow them all to get back to the Rangers' world. Back in the Rangers' world, Brainiac nearly takes control of Cyborg, but Billy Cranston is able to regain his powers in time to take Cyborg down so that Batman can reboot him. Brainiac has captured Alpha 5, officially to question him as the only other example of independent artificial sentience he has ever met, but Alpha, although speculating that Brainiac abducted him because the villain is lonely, rejects the idea that the two are similar, arguing that Brainiac's actions show a selfishness and an inability to grow where true sentience relies on making oneself open to working with others. After regaining their powers, the Rangers are able to rescue Alpha and force Brainiac into retreat.

In other media

Television

Live-action
 Brainiac appears in Smallville, portrayed by James Marsters. Introduced in the fifth season and also known as the BRAIN InterActive Construct, this version is a humanoid nano-supercomputer able to shapeshift and mimic Kryptonian abilities. Created by Kryptonian scientist Dax-Ur, completed by Jor-El, and corrupted by Major Zod, Brainiac joined Zod in destabilizing Krypton's core before eventually coming to Earth via Zod's disciples and assuming the alias of Central Kansas A&M University history professor Milton Fine to manipulate Clark Kent into releasing Zod from the Phantom Zone as well as Lex Luthor into becoming Zod's host. Upon learning the truth, Kent foils and seemingly destroys Brainiac. However, a copy of the latter appears in the seventh season, manipulating Bizarro into helping him regain his lost power by locating and killing Dax-Ur after downloading his memories while hiding out in Metropolis' Suicide Slums. Brainiac later impersonates Kara Zor-El (portrayed by Laura Vandervoort) and reveals Kent's secret identity to Luthor, but is defeated and seemingly destroyed by Kent once more. Nonetheless, a fragment of Brainiac appears in the eighth season episode "Legion", possessing Chloe Sullivan (portrayed by Allison Mack) in the hopes of unleashing Doomsday as part of Zod's contingency plan, only to be separated from Sullivan by Kent and the Legion of Super-Heroes before the latter take Brainiac to the future to reprogram him. As of the tenth season episode "Homecoming", Brainiac was successfully reprogrammed into Brainiac 5.
 Additionally, an alternate universe version of Milton Fine / Brainiac appears in the episode "Apocalypse". In a universe where Kent never arrived on Earth, Brainiac became the White House Chief of Staff under President Luthor, whom he successfully turned into Zod's host.
 Brainiac appears in Krypton, portrayed by Blake Ritson. This version is feared throughout the universe and has a design similar to his post-2008 comics incarnation, which was created via a combination of extensive makeup/prosthetics and CGI. In the first season, he attacks Krypton in an attempt to steal the capital city of Kandor, but Seg-El sacrifices himself to take Brainiac to the Phantom Zone with him. In season two, Brainiac temporarily transfers his consciousness into Seg's mind to escape the Phantom Zone.

Animation
 Brainiac appears The New Adventures of Superman, voiced by Cliff Owens.
 Brainiac appears in Challenge of the Super Friends, voiced by Ted Cassidy. This version is a member of the Legion of Doom.
 Brainiac appears in the Super Friends short "Superclone", voiced by Stanley Ralph Ross.
 The android incarnation of Brainiac appears in Super Friends: The Legendary Super Powers Show, voiced again by Stanley Ralph Ross.
 Brainiac appears in The Super Powers Team: Galactic Guardians episode "Brain Child", voiced again by Stanley Ralph Ross.
 Brainiac appears in the second season of Legion of Super Heroes (2006), voiced by Corey Burton. This version destroyed Krypton when he stole Kandor. Imperiex manipulates Brainiac 5 into accessing Brainiac's power, resulting in him being controlled by Brainiac, who kills Imperiex and sets out to conquer the universe. He is defeated by the Legion of Super-Heroes, but secretly survives and rebuilds himself using Brainiac 5's discarded armor.
 Brainiac appears in Batman: The Brave and the Bold, voiced by Richard McGonagle.
 Brainiac makes a cameo appearance in the Teen Titans Go! episode "Laundry Day".
 Brainiac appears in The Looney Tunes Show episode "SuperRabbit", voiced by Eric Bauza. This version is based on Marvin the Martian.
 Brainiac appears in Justice League Action, voiced by John de Lancie.

DC Animated Universe 

Brainiac appears in series set in the DC Animated Universe (DCAU), voiced by Corey Burton.
 First appearing in Superman: The Animated Series, this version was originally a supercomputer that ran Krypton. In the three-part pilot "The Last Son of Krypton", he secretly transfers his consciousness into a satellite upon learning of the planet's imminent destruction while dismissing Jor-El's warnings. Following Krypton's destruction, Brainiac created an android body and traveled to other planets to assimilate their information before destroying them, believing that the universe's vast knowledge is more precious in his possession. In the episode "Stolen Memories", he reaches Earth and approaches Lex Luthor under the pretense of peacefully exchanging knowledge with him. However, Superman discovers Brainiac's true intentions and seemingly destroys him along with his starship. Nonetheless, in the episodes "Ghost in the Machine" and "Knight Time", Brainiac downloaded his consciousness into LexCorp's computers and Wayne Enterprises' technological database to force Luthor to build a new body for him and use nanites to brainwash Bruce Wayne into constructing a new starship so he can leave Earth respectively, only to be thwarted by Superman on both occasions.
 A possible future version of Brainiac from the year 2979 appears in the episode "New Kids in Town", in which he travels back in time to kill a teenage Superman, only to be defeated by the Legion of Super-Heroes.
 Brainiac appears in the Justice League episode "Twilight". He attacks Apokolips with the intention of stealing its knowledge and destroying the planet, but Darkseid arranges for Brainiac to help him lure Superman and the Justice League into a trap in exchange for Brainiac sparing Apokolips. Capturing Superman in his asteroid headquarters, Brainiac attempts to extract his DNA and create an organic body for himself, but Darkseid betrays him to find the Anti-Life Equation. In the ensuing battle with the League, Brainiac and Darkseid are killed when the asteroid implodes.
 Brainiac appears in the Static Shock two-part episode "A League of Their Own". For this series, his voice was pitched down as the producers wanted a more "monstrous" performance from Burton as opposed to his usual cold and remorseless depiction. Prior to the episode, the League acquired one of Brainiac's circuit boards and contained it in the Watchtower, but a cosmic storm hits the facility, reactivating Brainiac and allowing him to take control of the Watchtower. He then brainwashes Gear to help him rebuild his body and brainwash of most of the League, but Static manages to shut down Brainiac and free his allies before they destroy the latter.
 Brainiac appears in Justice League Unlimited. In the episodes "Panic in the Sky" and "Divided We Fall", it is revealed that he secretly implanted a copy of himself into Luthor's body as a failsafe. Despite being dormant, he influenced Luthor's actions, cured him of his Kryptonite cancer, and granted him super-strength. Intending to transfer his consciousness into a duplicate of Amazo, Brainiac manipulates Luthor into funding Project Cadmus to obtain the necessary nanotechnology before revealing himself when the League and Amanda Waller attempt to apprehend Luthor. After being foiled and forced to escape, Luthor convinces Brainiac to use the alien Dark Heart technology at Cadmus to merge and recreate the universe in their shared image. However, the Flash taps into the Speed Force to purge Brainiac from Luthor's body. Surviving within his consciousness, Luthor spends the third season obsessively trying to bring Brainiac back, though his plans culminate in Darkseid's resurrection instead.

Film

Live-action
 During the early development of Superman III, Ilya Salkind wrote a script that featured Brainiac as the main antagonist, with Richard Pryor considered for the role. However, when Leslie and David Newman rewrote the script, Brainiac was cut from the film. 
 Brainiac was planned to appear in the scrapped Superman Reborn and Superman Lives film projects. Most notably, he was featured along with Lex Luthor and Doomsday in Kevin Smith's version of the script, which was later discarded by director Tim Burton, who sought to include Brainiac's intellect bonding with Lex Luthor to create "Lexiac".
 In 2007, director Bryan Singer reported that he wanted to use Brainiac in Superman: The Man of Steel, the planned sequel to Superman Returns. However, the project was scrapped by Warner Bros.
 Brainiac has been suggested to appear in films set in the DC Extended Universe and future Man of Steel sequels by director Zack Snyder.

Animation
 Brainiac appears in Superman: Brainiac Attacks, voiced by Lance Henriksen. After landing on Earth in a meteorite, he breaks into a Lexcorp facility and absorbs information from their computers, taking over a satellite weapon called the Lex 9000 in the process. While Superman destroys Brainiac, Lex Luthor saves a piece of the latter and forms an alliance with him, with Brainiac receiving a new body from Luthor in exchange for the former allowing the latter to defeat him so Luthor can appear as a hero. Per their deal, Luthor constructs a new body for Brainiac from the Lex 9000 and equips him with a kryptonite laser and the ability to track Kryptonian DNA. Following Superman's apparent death, Brainiac betrays Luthor before Superman battles the former until he is completely destroyed.
 The Vril Dox incarnation of Brainiac appears in Superman: Unbound, voiced by John Noble. Originally a Coluan scientist, he became obsessed with learning everything there was to know in the universe. Subjecting himself to extensive genetic and cybernetic enhancements, he gradually became the towering cyborg Brainiac before constructing a starship designed to interface with his cybernetic implants and become an extension of his own body and will so he can travel through space and absorb information on other planets and civilizations. Due to his cybernetic brain possessing a flaw that leaves him incapable of accepting that learning everything was impossible due to ever-changing planets and evolving civilizations, he created an army of robotic soldiers to attack cities on inhabited planets, killing anyone they deemed redundant, before using a force field projector to shrink said cities. Once this was done, he would launch a Solar Aggressor missile into the planet's sun, causing it to go supernova and consume the rest of the planet, preventing any new data from entering the universe. Sometime after stealing Kandor, he would eventually be defeated by Superman and Supergirl, who exploit his desire to learn everything and expose him to the totality of human activity on Earth, causing Brainiac to malfunction and destroy himself.
 Brainiac makes a cameo appearance in Lego Batman: The Movie - DC Super Heroes Unite, voiced by Troy Baker.
 Brainiac appears in Lego DC Comics Super Heroes: Justice League: Cosmic Clash, voiced by Phil LaMarr. This version miniaturizes, bottles, and collects planets instead of cities.
 Brainiac appears in DC Super Hero Girls: Intergalactic Games, voiced by Fred Tatasciore. This version is served by Lena Luthor, who builds robots for him.
 The Red Son incarnation of Brainiac appears in Superman: Red Son, voiced by Paul Williams.
 Brainiac appears in Justice Society: World War II, voiced by Darin De Paul. This version wields kryptonite bullets.
Brainiac appears in Legion of Super-Heroes (2023), voiced by Darin De Paul. As of the 31st century, this version founded the Dark Circle in an attempt to resurrect himself, only to be confronted by Legion Academy trainees Supergirl and Brainiac 5.

Video games
 Brainiac appears as the final boss of Superman.
 The DC Animated Universe (DCAU) incarnation of Brainiac appears as the final boss of and a playable character in Superman 64.
 Brainiac appears in Superman: The Man of Steel (1989).
 Brainiac 13 appears as the final boss of Superman: The Man of Steel (2002)
 Brainiac appears as a boss in the Nintendo DS version of Superman Returns.
 Brainiac appears as a boss in Justice League Heroes, voiced by Peter Jessop. He attacks S.T.A.R. Labs to search for a meteor, only to be defeated by Batman and Superman and possessed by Darkseid.
 The Vril Dox incarnation of Brainiac appears in DC Universe Online, voiced again by Corey Burton. This version is capable of creating enormous robots called Avatars and Sub-Avatars, which can mimic superhuman powers. Additionally, his technology was utilized by a future version of Lex Luthor to create "exobytes", highly advanced nanobots able to infuse an organic host with superpowers, which are used by the player characters.
 Brainiac appears as a support card in the mobile version of Injustice: Gods Among Us.
 Brainiac appears in Scribblenauts Unmasked: A DC Comics Adventure. With the help of Maxwell's Doppelgänger, he intends to use the Starites and Lily's globe to summon and merge with 51 of his multiversal doppelgangers. After betraying Doppelgänger, he is thwarted by Maxwell, who summons several alternate universe versions of the Justice League to defeat him.
 Brainiac appears as the final boss of and a playable character in Injustice 2, voiced by Jeffrey Combs. This version has destroyed billions of populated worlds, including Krypton, collected Argo City in addition to Kandor, and killed several members of the Green Lantern Corps. Additionally, he is primarily based on the post-2008 comics incarnation. Upon learning of Superman, who he believes is the last Kryptonian, Brainiac travels to Earth to collect their major cities, forming an alliance with Gorilla Grodd and brainwashing several of Earth's heroes to facilitate his plans. Despite running afoul of Superman's Regime and Batman's Insurgency, who reluctantly join forces to stop him, losing support from Grodd's Society, and Grodd being killed by Aquaman, Brainiac remains undeterred until either Superman or Batman defeat him. Depending on the ending, Brainiac will be killed by the former for his technology or spared by the latter.
 Brainiac will appear in Suicide Squad: Kill the Justice League.

Lego series
 Brainiac appears as a boss and unlockable character in Lego Batman 2: DC Super Heroes, voiced by Troy Baker.
 Brainiac appears in Lego Batman 3: Beyond Gotham, voiced by Dee Bradley Baker. This version seeks to collect planets instead of cities.
 Brainiac makes a cameo appearance in Lego Dimensions, voiced again by Dee Bradley Baker.
 Brainiac appears as an unlockable playable character in Lego DC Super-Villains.

Miscellaneous
 Brainiac appears in the novel The Last Days of Krypton, by Kevin J. Anderson. This version was originally known as the Brain InterActive Construct before Commissioner Dru-Zod renamed him Brainiac. Admiring Kandor's beauty and architecture, Brainiac sought to preserve the city before disaster struck like it did his home planet of Colu. After receiving approval from Zod, who agreed in exchange for the rest of Krypton, Brainiac stole Kandor without affecting the rest of the planet to honor their deal.
 Brainiac appears in vol. 2 issue #20 of the Young Justice tie-in comic book series.
 An alternate universe incarnation of Brainiac appears in the Justice League: Gods and Monsters Chronicles episode "Bomb", voiced by Tara Strong. This version is an android with psychic powers resembling a young boy who was created by Doctor Sivana as a contingency plan against his universe's Superman, with Sivana believing that only Superman or a small nuclear bomb can destroy Brainiac. However, Brainiac lost control of his powers and destroys most of Metropolis until Superman arrives and reluctantly kills him at the latter's behest.
 Vril Dox appears in the Arrowverse tie-in comic Adventures of Supergirl. This version is a greedy hacker from the planet Yod who was hired by an unknown individual to frame Supergirl's ally Winn Schott for funding and aiding terrorism and disguising himself as an A.I. that Win created called V.R.I.L. Vril discovers Supergirl's identity, but she finds and defeats him before he is arrested by the Department of Extranormal Operations (DEO).

Notes

References

External links
 Brainiac at Comic Vine

Villains in animated television series
Comics characters introduced in 1958
DC Comics characters who are shapeshifters 
DC Comics characters who have mental powers
DC Comics characters who can move at superhuman speeds
DC Comics characters who can teleport
DC Comics characters with accelerated healing
DC Comics characters with superhuman strength
DC Comics cyborgs
DC Comics extraterrestrial supervillains
DC Comics male supervillains
DC Comics robots 
DC Comics scientists
DC Comics telekinetics
DC Comics telepaths
Cyborg supervillains
Robot supervillains
Fictional androids
Fictional artificial intelligences
Fictional characters who can duplicate themselves 
Fictional characters who can manipulate reality
Fictional characters who can manipulate time
Fictional characters with immortality
Fictional characters with dimensional travel abilities
Fictional characters with eidetic memory
Fictional characters with energy-manipulation abilities
Fictional characters with spirit possession or body swapping abilities
Fictional characters with superhuman durability or invulnerability
Fictional extraterrestrial cyborgs
Fictional extraterrestrial robots
Fictional inventors
Fictional mass murderers
Fictional technopaths
Fighting game characters
Kryptonians
Fictional amorphous creatures
Fictional professors
Characters created by Otto Binder
Video game bosses
Superman characters
Time travelers